Amos Bartelsmeyer (born 25 July 1994) is a German track and field athlete who specializes in middle-distance running. He represented Germany at the 2019 World Athletics Championships and 2020 Summer Olympics competing in the men's 1500 metres.

References

German male middle-distance runners
1994 births
Living people
World Athletics Championships athletes for Germany
Athletes (track and field) at the 2020 Summer Olympics
Olympic athletes of Germany
People from Aschaffenburg
Sportspeople from Lower Franconia